Sir Thomas Foote, 1st Baronet (1598 – 12 October 1687) was a wealthy Citizen and grocer of London. He was Lord Mayor of the City of London in 1649. During the Protectorate he was knighted by the Lord Protector Oliver Cromwell in 1657, and after the Restoration (England) he was made a baronet by Charles II.

Biography
Thomas Foote was a son of John Foote and Margaret (née Brooke) of London and grandson of John Foote of Royston.

In 1646 Foote was made a Sheriff of London and in 1649 he was elected Lord Mayor of London. He represented London in the First and Second Protectorate Parliaments, and was knighted by the Lord Protector Oliver Cromwell on 5 December 1657 (this honour passed into oblivion at the restoration of the monarchy in May 1660).

Foote was created a baronet, of London, on 21 November 1660, with the title to revert on his death to his son-in-law, Arthur Onslow of West Clandon.

Foote died on 12 October 1687, in his 89th year and was buried in All Saints Church, West Ham, (then in Essex). As he left no sons to succeed him, his son-in-law, Arthur Onslow succeed to baronetcy.

Family
On 16 December 1625 Foote married Elizabeth Boddicot, widow of Augustine Boddicot. He had four daughters:
Priscilla Foote, married Sir Francis Rolle (d. 1686) on 23 January 1654.
Mary Foote, married Sir Arthur Onslow, 1st Baronet as his second wife. They had a number of children. 
Sarah Foote, married first Sir John Lewis, 1st Baronet (d. 1671) and second Denzil Onslow (d. 1721) (younger brother of Arthur).
Elizabeth Foote, married Sir John Cutler, 1st Baronet (1607–1693) as his second wife, they had a daughter who died before he did.

Notes

References
 
 

1598 births
1687 deaths
Place of birth unknown
Place of death unknown
Baronets in the Baronetage of England
Sheriffs of the City of London
17th-century lord mayors of London
Members of the Parliament of England for the City of London